Is There a Doctor in the Mouse? is a 1964 Tom and Jerry short directed and produced by Chuck Jones.

Plot
Jerry mixes and drinks a potion as the title card and credits are shown. After Jerry drinks the potion, he discovers that it gives him the power of superspeed; he tests this out by eating Tom's canister of sardines, along with the last bit of gravy and bits of his skin. Afterwards, Tom initially assumes that a ghost was eating his food, but concludes that it is a bug equipped with a jetpack and chattery teeth.

Tom slips a large slice of watermelon around the corner and readies a flyswatter. Jerry mows through all of the watermelon flesh, leaving poor Tom to scatter the rind and seeds around. When Tom sees an entire turkey being eaten, he panics terribly and takes a cluster of grapes and an apple from the table. This is when Jerry proceeds to eat the apple down to the core and the rest of the fruit and the grapes. After going berserk, Tom hides in the refrigerator and attempts to eat a stack of ribs, which Jerry proceeds to eat.

Tom then sets out a cake and films Jerry stealing it so he can see who is taking his food. After witnessing the filmed proof that Jerry is behind the charades, Tom sets up a mousetrap sandwich for Jerry, who does take the bait, but doesn't trigger the trap. When Tom triggers the trap from attempting to bite Jerry, his nose gets caught in the trap and he yells in pain, hitting himself into the chandelier. When Jerry takes a banana from the refrigerator, Tom grabs the banana and peels the skin. Jerry taunts him by kissing his nose then runs off, but when the effects of the potion wear off, Jerry barely escapes from Tom.

Jerry attempts to recreate the superspeed potion, but accidentally creates an enlargement potion, which enlarges its consumer to an unbelievably large size. Tom catches Jerry's tail and somehow manages to pull him through the wall. When Tom can no longer tug the load around, he turns around to see the mega-Jerry sadistically raising his eyebrows and waving at him. Tom begins to laugh at Jerry in disbelief but then begins to cry in fear as the cartoon closes.

Crew
Story: Michael Maltese, Chuck Jones
Animation: Ben Washam, Ken Harris, Don Towsley, Tom Ray, & Dick Thompson.
Backgrounds: Robert Gribbroek
Vocal Effects: Mel Blanc
In Charge of Production: Les Goldman
Co-Director & Layouts: Maurice Noble
Music: Eugene Poddany
Produced & Directed by Chuck Jones

Production notes
The title is a pun on the phrase "Is There a Doctor in the House?".

References

External links

1964 short films
1964 animated films
1964 films
1960s animated short films
Tom and Jerry short films
Short films directed by Chuck Jones
Films directed by Maurice Noble
Films scored by Eugene Poddany
Fiction about size change
1960s American animated films
1964 comedy films
Animated films without speech
Metro-Goldwyn-Mayer short films
Metro-Goldwyn-Mayer animated short films
MGM Animation/Visual Arts short films
Films with screenplays by Michael Maltese
1960s English-language films